And the Devil is their third accomplice (Arabic: وثالثهم الشيطان, Transliterated W'al Shaytan Thalethahoma) is a 1978 psychological drama romance film directed by Sami Shalaby and based on a scenario of the same name written by Youssef Francis. The film stars Mervat Amin and Mahmoud Yassin as a young couple who fall in love. The story is narrated from the present day by Hesham (Mahmoud Amin), telling the tale of how he ended up in prison after being accused of the kidnapping of Afaf (Mervat Amin), to the audience.

The movie is R-rated according to Dollar films as well as being nominated for best screenplay award in the 1978 Cairo International film festival.

Plot 

Hesham (Mahmoud Yassin) is a professional theatrical actor living in Cairo. The theater he works in was preparing to open the season with an Arabic version of the play written by Shakespeare, Hamlet. The movie transitions from the present day to flashback narrated by Hesham of how he arrived to his current stance. After asking for Afaf's hand in marriage, Hesham gets rejected by her father, causing the young couple to escape to the country side, where they would supposedly get married.

Meanwhile, Hesham suffers from a psychological disorder that we find out was the reason behind his attempt to suffocate his acting accomplice that was playing his mother in Hamlet. The disorder was based on Hesham's dedication in portraying and playing his character as he occasionally cannot snap out of his role. Afaf's father's reason for rejecting Hesham was based upon the fact that he had another groom in mind for his daughter which initiated the idea of escaping and caused Hesham to travel to Alexandria for a few days.

In Alexandria, Hesham was being offered a role in the movie Nawal, his acting accomplice, was in. He gets called upon Nawal to join her in her apartment where he continues to cheat on Afaf. He then goes to the country side where he would meet Afaf. Afaf continues to run away to the country side to be with him, accompanied by Yasser (the doctor). Upon her arrival, she finds out about Hesham's disorder. As Yasser leaves them alone, Hesham automatically snaps into a character, and sexually harassed Afaf but she escaped from his violent embrace.

As she is running away, she falls, hitting her head which causes a concussion. Whilst being found and taken to the hospital by a stranger, her dad calls the police and makes a claim that Hesham had kidnapped his daughter. Hesham precedes into seeing a psychiatrist to find out how to cure his condition. We find out from his confessions to the doctor that he had, at a young age, witnessed the rape of his mother by his uncle and could neither do something about it nor tell anyone as it would tarnish his mother's honor. The doctor then pays a visit to the theatre Hesham works in and continues to explain to the director that Hesham is slowly being cured and is no longer incapable of controlling his character, he is of no danger to anyone. Hesham them gets his job back and asks for Afaf's hand in marriage a second time in which her father accepts to prevent his daughter from running away again and to ensure her happiness.

Cast

Main cast
Mervat Amin as Afaf
Mahmoud Yassin as Hesham
Layla Taher as Nawal / Hashem's acting accomplice
Hanem Mohamed as Hesham's Aunt 
Layla Mokhtar as Nahed / Hesham's sister
Saad Ardash as Afaf's father
Ahmad Khamis as Nageeb Hamdi
Mohamed Wafik as detective
Nabil Al Desouki as Psychiatrist
Salah El Eskandarani as Ma'thoun
Badria Abd El Gawad as Badria Al Sayed

Supporting cast
Sulah Rashwan 
Farouk al-Fishawy
Fifi Youssef
Moustafa Al Shami
Mourad Sleiman
Mahmoud Zohari
Ali Azb
Mohamed abu Hashish
Mona Abdullah

Casting 

Casting was administered by Galal Zahra. It is not unusual for Mahmoud Yassin and Mervat Amin to be together in a movie as they were portrayed as lovers in many other movies like Ayam Al Rub (Days of Terror), Daqqit Qal (A heart's beat), and La Tatrokoni Wahdi ( Do not Leave me alone).

Production 

The film was a Union films and Dollar films production which was distributed worldwide. The film was shot on 20 March and is 115 minutes long. The story was written by Gamal Hamad as well as the scenario by Yousef Francis and Ahmad Abd El Wahab. The crew included:

Assistant producer: Abd el Lateef Zaki and Mahmoud Hussen
Camera man: Mohamed Shaker
Assistant Camera man: Makram Salem
Photography: Hussein Bakr
Editor: Enayat El Sayes
Negative Photography: Adek Shokry
Sound Recordring: Arnset Sabbagh
Sound Effects: Al Shohary
Production Manager: Abdel Aziz Ali
Musical Composition: El Sayed Bder
Montage: Abdel Aziz Fokhary
Tunes and Instrumental: Gamal Salama
Interior photography: Cinema City Labs and Al Ahram studios

Commercial and Critical reception 

Having received the Adults only seal from the board of censors in Egypt, the film debuted on the 20th of March 1978 to returns over 500,000 LE in its first week. It was also nominated for best screenplay award in the 1978 Cairo International film festival, but failed to win. It was also rated at 5.7/10 by cinema.com

Some of Egypt's lawmakers took to the floor of the people's assembly and responded to protests  against the film for its sexually explicit content.

External links 

http://www.elcinema.com/work/1007129/gallery/123733375
http://hobaaflam.blogspot.ae/2013/04/blog-post_7528.html
https://web.archive.org/web/20171216093039/http://www.fbrka.com/forums/showthread.php?t=12049
http://nadycinema.com/file.php?a=pregame&f=24875